Big and Little Wong Tin Bar, also known as Seven Little Valiant Fighters and Two of a Kind, is a 1962 Hong Kong film. It is notable for being Jackie Chan's and Sammo Hung's film debut. Until 2016, the film was considered lost. The only footage that survived before that period were a 9-minute opening clip and a short 5-minute clip of dialogue. The film was rediscovered when a complete copy was released onto YouTube on 3 February 2016.

Plot
Old hero Wong Samtai, is hosting a banquet for warriors from the four seas. The invitation is received also by the head of the Black Wind fortress Kam Ching, who wants to marry his daughter Lotus to his son Wong Tinbar. But Tinbar does not want this wedding and sees his future with Cheung Kwailan. The afflicted Ching and his daughter steal the jade seal, which belongs to the King of Magical Power. Tinbar is accused of theft. He fails to find a seal and his father is imprisoned. Cheung Kwailan is trapped in the Black Wind Fortress during an overnight search along with Tinbar, but the sudden appearance of the Seven Little Rookies saves her from captivity. Thanks to this, her searches continue and lead to the Dragon Cave with a poisonous python, where the seal is located. Nevertheless, Tinbar is under arrest by the lord. Kwailan and the Seven Rascals force the culprits to surrender - this is part of the Tinbar rescue mission at the lord's residence to settle this problem once and for all.

Cast
NOTE: Many actors who were featured in this film do not have the same names as they do today, this was due to them taking their master's name which is part of Chinese tradition while studying martial arts.

Yu Kai as Wong Tinbar
Yuen Lau ( Jackie Chan) – Played a singing kid and fights a man.
Yuen Lung (a.k.a. Sammo Hung) – Played an unknown kid.
Yuen Wah 
Ho Siu-hung – as Master Wong Sam-tai
Cheng Bik-ying – as Cheung Kwai-lan
Yam Yin – as Lotus
Lau Hark-suen – as Black Wind Fortress Kam Ching

Additional cast
Yuen Fu (a.k.a. Lee Kuk-wah)
Yuen Ting (a.k.a. Ng Ming-choi)
Yuen Man (a.k.a. Mang Yuen-man)
Yuen Tai
Lam Yim
Mui Yan
Yam Tai-koon
Wah Wan-fung

Chronology of events
Until 2009, the film was considered lost. After many decades in which this film was considered lost it was found in the Hong Kong Film Archive (HKFA). To this day the film has only screened twice – on 14 and 22 November 2009 – at the Cinema of the HKFA.

A few days after the two screenings, in December 2009, two short clips (a 9-minute opening clip and a short 5-minute clip of dialogue) were uploaded to YouTube. On 3 February 2016 the full movie was uploaded to YouTube.

Until the screenings at the Cinema of the HKFA and the upload in 2016, there were 3 known scenes involving Jackie Chan and some kids only. He fights someone older and then sings. Some footage of this film is shown in Jackie Chan: My Story.

Filming Information
Big and Little Wong Tin Bar was filmed in Hong Kong in the Cantonese language using Black-and-white 35 mm film with a Mono audio track.

See also
List of Hong Kong films
Jackie Chan filmography
List of rediscovered films

References

External links 

Big and Little Wong Tin Bar at the Hong Kong Film Archive
Big and Little Wong Tin Bar on YouTube

1962 films
1962 martial arts films
1960s Cantonese-language films
Hong Kong martial arts films
1960s rediscovered films
Films set in the Qing dynasty